Kamares (Greek: Καμάρες) is a village and a community in the east-northeastern part of Achaea, Greece. Kamares was an independent commune until 1994 when it became part of the municipality of Erineos, of which it was the seat. Erineos became part of the municipality Aigialeia in 2011. The community Kamares consists of the villages Kamares, Bouka and Pefka. Kamares is situated near the Gulf of Corinth, 9 km northwest of Aigio. The Greek National Road 8A (Patras - Corinth) and the railway from Patras to Corinth ( not in operation anymore since OSE announced the suspension of all the rail service in the Peloponnese in January 2011) run through the village.

Historical population

External links
Official website of the municipality of Aigialeia (in Greek)
 Official website of the municipal unit of Erineos (in Greek)
 Erineos on GTP Travel Pages

References

Populated places in Achaea